The 1985 Wan Chai District Board election was held on 7 March 1985 to elect all 10 elected members to the 16-member Wan Chai District Board.

Overall election results

Results by constituency

Causeway Bay Central

Happy Valley

Tai Hang and So Kon Po

Wan Chai East

Wan Chai West

See also
 1985 Hong Kong local elections

References

1985 Hong Kong local elections
Wan Chai District Council elections